Helldorado is an alternative country rock band from Norway. They draw inspiration from a wide variety of sources, including Spaghetti Western, film noir, Country Gothic/cowpunk/country rock/Americana, garage rock, surf rock, psychobilly/gothabilly, and Tex-Mex/mariachi. The band is virtually unknown in the United States, but they have a strong fanbase in their home country and Turkey.

Discography

Albums
 Lost Highway (Helldorado album)|Lost Highway (2002) (EP)
 Director's Cut (2004)
 The Ballad of Nora Lee (2005)
 Sinful Soul (2009)
 Bones In The Closet (2012) (single, vinyl and digital)
 Bones In The Closet (2013) (album, cd, vinyl and digital)

External links 
 www.helldorado.no

Norwegian country rock groups
Norwegian alternative country groups
Musical groups established in 2000
2000 establishments in Norway
Musical groups from Stavanger